He-Man: Power of Grayskull is an isometric action game for the Game Boy Advance published by TDK Mediactive in 2002.

Reception

The game was received generally mixed reviews from video games critics.

References

External links
 He-Man: Power of Grayskull at UK GameSpot
 

2002 video games
Masters of the Universe video games
Beat 'em ups
Game Boy Advance games
Game Boy Advance-only games
North America-exclusive video games
Action video games
Video games scored by Allister Brimble
Video games developed in the United States
Video games set on fictional planets
TDK Mediactive games
Single-player video games